Fushouling station is a station under renovation on Line 1 of the Beijing Subway.

History

Before May 28, 2007, two Line 1 trains stopped by this station each day to allow students and workers of the metro technical school nearby to alight; one stopped in the morning and one stopped in the evening. The station is served by several public bus routes, some of which bypass Pingguoyuan station. Of the four entrances/exits, only one was readily accessible until the station's full closure; the other three entrances/exits were sealed with cement long ago, and the remaining entrance is locked behind a metal gate. Since the station's full closure, trains no longer stop at the station; however, some trains pass by the station to reverse by traveling through a balloon loop west of the station.

Renovation
Renovation of the station began on 25 November 2021, and it will open to the public in 2023.

References

Beijing Subway stations in Shijingshan District